Anatoly Konstantinovich Rozhdestvensky (1920–1983) was a Soviet paleontologist responsible for naming many dinosaurs, including Aralosaurus and Probactrosaurus.

References 

Soviet paleontologists
1920 births
1983 deaths